The president of Lazio  is the head of government of the Italian region of Lazio. The presidency was created in 1970.

The president was appointed by the Regional Council of Lazio during the first five legislatures. Since 1995, as confirmed by the 1999 constitutional reform, he is directly elected by popular vote.

See also 
 List of presidents of Lazio

Lazio
 
Politics of Lazio
Lazio